Clyde Lee Edward Grosscup (December 27, 1936June 1, 2020) was an American professional football player who later became a sportscaster.

Collegiate career
Born and raised in Santa Monica, California, Grosscup was a quarterback for the University of Washington in Seattle in 1955. He and three former high school teammates left the school shortly after their freshman season; deciding to sit out a year instead of continuing to play for the "tyrannical" John Cherberg in Seattle. He attended Santa Monica College, then transferred to the University of Utah in Salt Lake City in 1957, leading a passing offense under head coach Jack Curtice that was advanced for its time. Monday Night Football broadcaster Al Michaels credits Grosscup for developing the shovel pass or "Utah pass," although Grosscup acknowledges that the play was used decades earlier in the 1920s.

Grosscup finished his junior season in 1957, completing 94 of 137 passes (68.6%) for 1,398 yards and 10 touchdowns. He was named a first-team All-American by Look, the Newspaper Enterprise Association, the Williamson National Football Rating, and Today and finished tenth in the balloting for the Heisman Trophy, won by John David Crow of Texas A&M.

A shoulder injury hampered his senior season under first-year head coach Ray Nagel in 1958, but Grosscup was selected to play in the Senior Bowl in early 1959.

Professional career
Selected by the New York Giants with the tenth overall pick in the 1959 NFL Draft, Grosscup appeared in eight games in his three seasons with the Giants. The Giants were the Eastern champions in 1959 and 1961, but fell in both title games on the road. In August 1962, his contract was purchased by the second-year Minnesota Vikings, but he was cut before the beginning of the season. This allowed Grosscup to return to New York in September, this time with the New York Titans of the American Football League, in its third season. He began the season as the starter, but missed six weeks with a knee injury. Grosscup was cut on the final day of the 1963 preseason and signed with the Saskatchewan Roughriders of the Canadian Football League three days later. That same year, Grosscup released his first book, entitled Fourth and One.

After failing to make the San Francisco 49ers, Grossup spent the 1964 season on the Oakland Raiders' taxi squad. He was cut by the Raiders the following season and signed with the Hartford Charter Oaks of the newly formed Continental Football League.

Broadcasting career
After the 1966 season, Grosscup began a career in broadcasting. He spent one season calling AFL games for NBC before beginning a twenty-year stint as a college football analyst for ABC, working alongside notable voices such as Bill Flemming, Chris Schenkel, Keith Jackson, Verne Lundquist and Al Michaels.

Grosscup was also a broadcaster in the USFL, first as a radio analyst for the Oakland Invaders, then as a television analyst on ABC from 1984–1985.

Grosscup was a voter in the Harris Interactive College Football Poll.

California Golden Bears
Grosscup was a member of the California Golden Bears broadcast team for 32 years, including 17 years as a color analyst and 15 years as part of the team's postgame coverage.

From 1986 to 2003, Grosscup was the radio analyst for  broadcasts alongside Joe Starkey. Former Cal quarterback Mike Pawlawski took over as radio analyst in 2004 despite Grosscup's willingness to continue until 2007. Grosscup hosted the postgame radio show for Cal football games from 2004 until his retirement in 2018.

See also
 List of American Football League players

References

External links

1936 births
2020 deaths
American Football League announcers
American football quarterbacks
California Golden Bears football announcers
Canadian Football League announcers
Canadian football quarterbacks
College football announcers
Continental Football League players
New York Giants players
New York Titans (AFL) players
Oakland Raiders announcers
Players of American football from Santa Monica, California
Santa Monica Corsairs football players
Saskatchewan Roughriders players
United States Football League announcers
Utah Utes football players
Washington Huskies football players